Nicholas Jose (born 9 November 1952) is an Australian novelist.

Biography
Born Robert Nicholas Jose in London, England, to Australian parents, Nicholas Jose grew up mostly in Adelaide, South Australia. He was educated at the Australian National University and Oxford University. He has traveled extensively, particularly in China, where he worked from 1986 to 1990. He was President of Sydney PEN from 2002 to 2005, Visiting Chair of Australian Studies at Harvard University from 2009 to 2010, and is currently Professor of English and Creative Writing both at the University of Adelaide and Bath Spa University, England. He has written widely on contemporary art and literature from Asia and the Pacific.

In 2016 Jose presented "Gifts from China" for the Eric Rolls Memorial Lecture.

Since early 2017 Nicholas Jose has been involved in a research project, 'Other Worlds: Forms of "World Literature'", for which he is leading a theme on 'Antipodean China' exploring the relationship between Chinese literature and world literature.

Awards and nominations
 1973 University Medal for English, Australian National University
 1990 shortlisted for the Miles Franklin Award - Avenue of Eternal Peace
 1997 shortlisted for the Commonwealth Writers' Prize, South-East Asia - The Custodians
 2003 shortlisted for The Age Book of the Year, Non-fiction - Black Sheep

Bibliography

Novels
 Rowena's Field (1984)
 Paper Nautilus (1987)
 Avenue of Eternal Peace (1989)
 The Rose Crossing (1994)
 The Custodians (1997)
 The Red Thread (2000)
 Original Face ( 2005)

Short story collections
 The Possession of Amber (1980)
 Feathers or Lead (1986)
 Bapo (2014)

Non-fiction
 Chinese Whispers (1995)
 Black Sheep: Journey to Borroloola (2002)

As editor
 Macquarie PEN Anthology of Australian Literature (2009)
 The Literature of Australia (2009)

References

External links
 Official site
 Interview Radio National
 Macquarie PEN Anthology

1952 births
Living people
20th-century Australian novelists
21st-century Australian novelists
Academics of Bath Spa University
Australian male novelists
Australian non-fiction writers
Australian male short story writers
English emigrants to Australia
Writers from Adelaide
Writers from London
20th-century Australian short story writers
21st-century Australian short story writers
20th-century Australian male writers
21st-century Australian male writers
Male non-fiction writers